Long-running shows can refer to:

Lists by country
  International list of longest-running TV shows by category  
 List of longest-running Australian television series
 List of longest-running Indian television series
 List of longest-running Philippine television series
 List of longest-running Spanish television series
 List of longest-running UK television series
 List of longest-running United States television series
 List of longest-running U.S. cable television series
 List of longest-running U.S. primetime television series
 List of longest-running U.S. syndicated television series
 List of longest-running U.S. broadcast network television series

Theatre
 Long-running musical theatre productions